Cuyamaca Peak is a mountain peak of the Cuyamaca Mountains range, in San Diego County, Southern California.

Geography
At , its summit is the second highest point in San Diego County.

It is east of the city of San Diego and southwest of Julian.

Ecology
Snows in winter are common above  and surrounding regions in Cuyamaca Rancho State Park. During summer, Bracken Ferns, a variety of wildflowers and native bunchgrasses dominate mountain meadows and the forest floor. Prior to the Cedar Fire, Black oaks once lit up the mountain.

Cedar Fire
In October 2003, the Cedar Fire burned the once abundant White Fir (Abies concolor), Incense Cedar (Calocedrus decurrens), Jeffrey Pine, Coulter Pine, Sugar Pine, and Black oak (Quercus kelloggii) that once lined the mountain.

Small seedlings of new White fir, Sugar Pine, Coulter Pine, Jeffrey Pine, and Incense Cedar were seen within a year of the Cedar Fire, and were thriving as saplings by 2007, an example of fire ecology.

Precipitation
The significant elevation of Cuyamaca relative to its surrounding landscape catches Pacific moisture easily, forming clouds which are forced to release their moisture in order to pass East, resulting in average annual precipitation between 20 and 32 inches. Fall and Winter storms account for 70%, summer thunderstorms largely accounting for the balance. During the winter snow may fall and hoar frost is common upon the highest elevations.

Views

To the west, the Pacific Ocean, the Coronado Islands of Mexico, the coast line of San Diego County, Viejas Mountain, and El Cajon Mountain can be seen.

Looking north, one can see  Palomar Mountain among the ridge of Palomar Mountains. On very clear days  Toro Peak in the Santa Rosas and the San Jacintos are visible. Closer yet is Volcan Mountain slightly to the northeast, the former gold rush town of Julian lying in front. Directly north are the closest summits, Middle and North Peaks.

Directly east is the Anza Borrego Desert and the Laguna Mountains, including Whale Peak. Far beyond is the Salton Sea. To the south are Lyons Peak and Lawson Peak; further yet and to the southeast are Mexican border mountains such as Table Top Mountain and the Sierra de Juárez.

See also
 Cuyamaca Rancho State Park
 Cuyamaca Mountains
 Cleveland National Forest

Gallery

References

External links

 
 
 
 

Cuyamaca Mountains
Mountains of San Diego County, California
Mountains of Southern California